Hornsea Bridge railway station was a railway station which served the town of Hornsea in the East Riding of Yorkshire, England. It was on the Hull and Hornsea Railway and the other station serving the town (the other being Hornsea Town).

It opened on 28 March 1864 and closed, as recommended by the Beeching Report, on 19 October 1964.

This station was originally to have been the terminus of the Hull and Hornsea railway and was the goods station for Hornsea throughout its existence. The passenger platforms were on an embankment with the goods yard to the north at ground level.

After the station was demolished, the site is occupied by a new road layout with the large goods yard, which is now the site of an industrial estate. The embankment can be traced at the western end of the station site, the section at the eastern side of the road continues to Hornsea Town as a footpath. That is the only major break in the railway formation on the line.

References

External links
 Hornsea Bridge station on navigable 1947 O. S. map

Hornsea
Disused railway stations in the East Riding of Yorkshire
Former North Eastern Railway (UK) stations
Beeching closures in England
Hull and Hornsea Railway
Railway stations in Great Britain opened in 1864
Railway stations in Great Britain closed in 1964